WorldLink Communications is an Internet service provider in Nepal. The nation's largest ISP, it has 900,000 active consumer accounts and 2,000 business accounts, along with approximately 25,000 subscribers to its NET TV IPTV service, and covers 73 of the nation's 77 districts. As of 2023, it has around 700,000 fiber to the home customers and 31% market share in Nepal.

References

External links
 
 

Internet service providers
Telecommunications companies of Nepal
1995 establishments in Nepal